Miguel Ángel Carballo (born 22 March 1979) is an Argentine professional golfer. Known affectionately as "El Tati", Carballo was the first Argentine to win on the Nationwide Tour. He has played on several Tours in his career, including the Web.com Tour (2007–11, 2013–14), European Tour (2006), Challenge Tour (2004–05), Tour de las Américas from (2003–04) and the Tour Argentino (2002–03). He played on the PGA Tour in 2012 and 2014.

Career
Carballo made the cut in 17 of 25 starts during his rookie season on the 2007 Nationwide Tour and finished the season No. 31 on the money list, with $177,712. He won the season-opening Movistar Panama Championship in his first-ever Nationwide Tour start, earning full status on Tour through the end of the 2008 season. He gained entry into the field by being one of the top-eight players on the Tour de las Américas Order of Merit.

Carballo posted his first professional victory at the 2006 Abierto Telefonica de Guatemala, a co-sanctioned event on the Challenge Tour and the Tour de las Américas. He earned his European Tour card for the first time by staging a phenomenal comeback at the 108-hole European Tour Qualifying School in 2005, posting a birdie, hole-in-one, birdie finish on the final three holes to gain playing privileges.

By ranking 10th on the Nationwide Tour's money list in 2011, Carballo earned his PGA Tour card for 2012. He made only 13 cuts in 25 starts and failed to retain his card for 2013. He returned to the now-renamed Web.com Tour for 2013 and finished 23rd on the regular season money list to earn his 2014 PGA Tour card.

He was awarded the 2011 Olimpia de Plata by the Argentine Sports Journalists' Circle.

After struggling on the PGA Tour, Carballo played on the Asian Development Tour in 2018, where he had won the Ciputra Golfpreneur Tournament in Indonesia and led the Order of Merit to earn promotion to the Asian Tour. He also won on the 2019 Asian Development Tour, taking the Singha Laguna Phuket Open, an event co-sanctioned with the All Thailand Golf Tour. In September 2019, he won his first Asian Tour event, the Bank BRI Indonesia Open.

Professional wins (7)

Asian Tour wins (1)

Web.com Tour wins (2)

Web.com Tour playoff record (0–2)

Challenge Tour wins (1)

1Co-sanctioned by the Tour de las Américas

Challenge Tour playoff record (1–0)

Tour de las Américas wins (1)

1Co-sanctioned by the Challenge Tour

Asian Development Tour wins (2)

1Co-sanctioned by the PGA Tour of Indonesia
2Co-sanctioned by the All Thailand Golf Tour

TPG Tour wins (1)

See also
2005 European Tour Qualifying School graduates
2011 Nationwide Tour graduates
2013 Web.com Tour Finals graduates
2015 Web.com Tour Finals graduates
2016 Web.com Tour Finals graduates

External links

Argentine male golfers
European Tour golfers
PGA Tour golfers
Korn Ferry Tour graduates
Golfers at the 2019 Pan American Games
Pan American Games competitors for Argentina
Sportspeople from Bahía Blanca
1979 births
Living people